Panteleyevskaya is a rural locality (a village) in Yavengskoye Rural Settlement, Vozhegodsky District, Vologda Oblast, Russia. The population was 26 as of 2002.

Geography 
Panteleyevskaya is located 27 km northeast of Vozhega (the district's administrative centre) by road. Ulitinskaya is the nearest rural locality.

References 

Rural localities in Vozhegodsky District